This is an alphabetical list of notable libraries around the world. It includes both notable public lending libraries and research libraries.

Alphabetical

A

 Advocates' Library, Edinburgh, Scotland 
 African Heritage Research Library and Cultural Centre, Adeyipo Village, Ibadan, Nigeria 
 Alexandria Library, Alexandria, Virginia, United States
 Alice Springs Public Library, Alice Springs, Australia
 Allahabad Public Library, Allahabad, India
 Allegheny County Library Association, Pittsburgh, Pennsylvania, United States
 Aloghar Library, Dhaka, Bangladesh
 American Memorial Library, Berlin, Germany
 Ann Arbor District Library, Ann Arbor, Michigan, United States
 Archive for Research in Archetypal Symbolism
 Argostoli Public Library, Kefalonia, Greece
 Arlanza Branch Library, Riverside, California, United States
 Astan Quds Razavi's Central Library, Mashhad, Iran
 Australian National University Library, Canberra, Australia

B

 Baltimore County Public Library, Baltimore, Maryland, United States
 Barrow-in-Furness Main Public Library, Cumbria, England
 Bayerische Staatsbibliothek, Munich, Bavaria, Germany
 Beinecke Rare Book and Manuscript Library, New Haven, Connecticut, United States
 Beit Ariela, Tel Aviv, Israel
 Berlin Art Library (Kunstbibliothek Berlin), Berlin, Germany
 Berlin Central and Regional Library, Berlin, Germany
 Berlin State Library, Berlin, Germany
 Bhaikaka Library, Vallabh Vidyanagar, Gujarat, India
 Biblioteca de Catalunya, Barcelona, Catalonia, Spain
 Biblioteca Estense, Modena, Italy
 Biblioteca Nacional de Chile, Santiago, Chile
 Biblioteca Nacional de España, Madrid, Spain
 Biblioteca Nacional de Portugal, Lisbon, Portugal
 Biblioteca Nazionale Centrale Firenze, Firenze, Italy
 Biblioteca Nazionale Centrale Roma, Rome, Italy
 Biblioteca Nacional, San Jose, Costa Rica
 Biblioteca Pública de Pichilemu, Pichilemu, Chile
 Bibliotheca Alexandrina, Egypt
 Bibliothèque nationale de France, Paris, France
 Bibliothèque de l'Arsenal, Paris, France
 Bibliothèque universitaire des langues et civilisations, Paris, France
 Birmingham Central Library, England
 Bizzell Memorial Library, University of Oklahoma, Norman, Oklahoma, United States
 Bodleian Library, Oxford, England
 Boston Public Library, United States
 Botanical Research Institute of Texas Library, Fort Worth, Texas, United States
 British Library, London, England
 British Library of Political and Economic Science, London, England
 Brooklyn Public Library, United States
 Broward County Library, Fort Lauderdale, Florida, United States
 Bugvia library, Bhera, Pakistan
 Burton Barr Central Library, Phoenix, Arizona, United States

C

 Cal Poly Pomona University Library at Cal Poly Pomona, United States
 Calgary Public Library, Calgary, Alberta, Canada
 Cambridge University Library, England
 Canada Institute for Scientific and Technical Information  (CISTI), Ottawa, Ontario, Canada
 Carnegie Library of Pittsburgh, Pittsburgh, Pennsylvania, United States
 Carolina Rediviva at Uppsala University, Sweden
 Catholic National Library, Farnborough, Hampshire, England
 Center for Jewish History, Manhattan, United States
 Cerritos Millennium Library in Cerritos, California, United States
 Changhua City Library, Changhua County, Taiwan
 Charles V. Park Library at Central Michigan University, Mount Pleasant, Michigan, United States
 Chekhov Library in Taganrog, Russia
 Chetham's Library in Manchester, England
 Chicago Public Library, Chicago, Illinois, United States
 Chincoteague Island Library, Chincoteague Island, Virginia, United States
 Chongqing Library, Chongqing, China
 Cincinnati Public Library, Cincinnati, Ohio, United States
 City of Playford Library Service in Adelaide, Australia
 Cleveland Public Library, Cleveland, Ohio, United States
 Clinton-Macomb Public Library, Clinton Charter Township, Michigan, United States
 College of DuPage Library, Glen Ellyn, Illinois, United States
 Cologne Public Library, Cologne, Germany
 Columbia Public Library, Columbia, Missouri, United States
 Columbus Metropolitan Library, Columbus, Ohio, United States
 Connemara Public Library, Chennai, India
 Contra Costa County Library, Pleasant Hill, California, United States
 Cornish Studies Centre, Redruth, Cornwall, England
 Cory Library for Historical Research, Rhodes University, Grahamstown, South Africa
 Cosy Nook Library, Bangalore, India
 County of Los Angeles Public Library, Los Angeles County, California, United States
 Cuyahoga County Public Library, Cleveland, Ohio, United States

D

 Danish Royal Library in Copenhagen, Denmark
 David Lubin Memorial Library, Rome, Italy
 Detroit Public Library, Detroit, Michigan
 Deutsche Bücherei Leipzig, Leipzig
 District of Columbia Public Library
 Doe Library, University of California Berkeley, Berkeley, California, United States
 Dr. Mahmud Hussain Library, University of Karachi, Karachi, Pakistan
 Dr. Vijay Pal Memorial Library, Delhi, India
 Dr Williams's Library, Bloomsbury, London
 Drill Hall Library, Chatham, Kent, England
 Duchess Anna Amalia Library, Weimar, Germany
 Dyal Singh Trust Library, Lahore, Pakistan

E

Edmonton Public Library, Edmonton, Alberta, Canada 
Elyachar Central Library, Haifa, Israel
Enoch Pratt Free Library, Baltimore, Maryland, United States
 EveningHour Library, Hyderabad, India

F

 Fairfax County Public Library, Fairfax, Virginia, United States
 Family History Library, Salt Lake City, Utah, United States
 Folger Shakespeare Library, Washington, DC, United States
 Francis Skaryna Belarusian Library and Museum, London, United Kingdom
 Frank Melville Jr. Memorial Library, Stony Brook University, Stony Brook, New York, United States
 Free Library of Philadelphia, Philadelphia, Pennsylvania, United States

G

 German Central Library for the Blind, Leipzig, Germany
 German National Library, Frankfurt am Main, Leipzig, Berlin, Germany
 German National Library of Economics, Kiel and Hamburg
 German National Library of Medicine, Cologne and Bonn
 German National Library of Science and Technology, Hanover
 Ghalib Library, Karachi, Pakistan
 Glasgow University Library, Scotland
 Göttingen State and University Library, Germany
 Grande Bibliothèque du Québec, Montreal, Quebec, Canada
 Guangzhou Library, Guangzhou, China
 Greifswald University Library, Greifswald, Germany

H

 Halifax Central Library
 Haskell Free Library and Opera House
Hesburgh Library, Notre Dame, Indiana, United States
 Hessian State Library, Wiesbaden, Germany
 Hershey Public Library, Hershey, Pennsylvania, United States
 Hilandar Research Library, Ohio State University, United States
 Williams Research Center, New Orleans, Louisiana, United States
 Homer Babbidge Library, University of Connecticut, Storrs, United States
 Hong Kong Central Library, Causeway Bay, Hong Kong Island
 Houston Public Library, Houston, Texas, United States
 Hummelstown Public Library, Hummelstown, Pennsylvania, United States
 Huntington Library, San Marino, California, United States

I
 Illinois State Library, Springfield, Illinois
 Imperial College Central Library, London, England
 Imperial Library of Constantinople
 International Association of Aquatic and Marine Science Libraries and Information Centers
 International Library of African Music, Rhodes University, Grahamstown, South Africa

J
 Jacksonville Public Library

 James V. Brown Library
 Jenkins Law Library, Philadelphia
 John Crerar Library
 John Rylands Library
 John Rylands University Library
 Jubilee Library, Brighton

K

 Kedermister Library
 Kenton County Public Library, Kentucky
 Kenton County Public Library, Oregon
 Khaliq Dina Hall, Karachi, Pakistan
 Knight Library, University of Oregon, Eugene, Oregon
 Koninklijke Bibliotheek, Netherlands

L

 Leiden University Library, Leiden, Netherlands
 Library of Alexandria, Ancient Egypt
 Library of Birmingham, Birmingham
 Library of Congress, Washington, D.C.
 Library of Parliament, Ottawa
 Library of Sir Thomas Browne
 Library of the Russian Academy of Sciences
 Library of Universiti Sains Malaysia, Penang, Malaysia
 Lied Library, University of Nevada, Las Vegas
 Lilly Library, Indiana University Bloomington, Indiana
 Linen Hall Library, Belfast
 Lithuanian Technical Library, Vilnius
 London Library
 Los Angeles Central Library
 Louisville Free Public Library, Louisville, Kentucky
 Louisville Public Library, Louisville, Ohio, USA
 Ludwigshafen University Library, Ludwigshafen, Germany
 Luís Ángel Arango Library, Bogotá, Colombia

M

 Madan Puraskar Pustakalaya, Nepal
 Makerere University Library, Uganda
 Malcolm A. Love Library (San Diego State University), San Diego, California
 Malek National Library, Tehran, Iran
 Manchester Central Library, England
 Marathon County Public Library (MCPL), Wausau, Wisconsin
 Mário de Andrade Library in São Paulo
 Mark O. Hatfield Library, at Willamette University
 Marsh's Library in Dublin
 Martynas Mažvydas National Library of Lithuania, Vilnius
 Masood Jhandir Research Library, Mailsi, Pakistan
 Maughan Library at King's College London
 McGill University Library, Montreal
 Merton College Library, at Merton College, Oxford (oldest continually functioning library in the world)
 Miami-Dade Public Library System
 Michigan State University Libraries
 Milli Kütüphane (National Library of Turkey, Ankara)
 Minneapolis Public Library, Minneapolis, Minnesota
 Mitchell Library, Glasgow
 Moncton Public Library, Moncton, New Brunswick
 Montgomery County Public Libraries, Rockville, Maryland
 Moorland-Spingarn Research Center
 Moreland City Libraries, City of Moreland, Australia
 Morton Grove Public Library, Morton Grove, Illinois
 Multnomah County Library, Multnomah County, Oregon
 Musical Electronics Library, Auckland, New Zealand

N

 National Agricultural Library
 National Central Library, Florence
 National Central Library, Rome
 National Diet Library, Tokyo and Kyoto, Japan
 National Library of Armenia, Yerevan
 National Library of Australia, Canberra
 National and University Library of Bosnia and Herzegovina, Sarajevo
 National Library of Brazil, Rio de Janeiro
 National Library of Canada
 National Library of China, Beijing, China
 National Library of India, Kolkata
 National Library of Iran, Tehran
 National Library of Ireland, Dublin
 National Library of Israel, Jerusalem, Israel
 National Library of Malaysia, Kuala Lumpur
 National Library of Medicine
 National Library of New Zealand, Wellington
 National Library of Nigeria, Abuja
 National Library of Pakistan, Islamabad, Pakistan
 National Library of Public Information, Taichung, Taiwan
 National Library of Russia in St Petersburg
 National Library of Scotland, Edinburgh
 National Library of Serbia, Belgrade
 National Library of South Africa, Cape Town and Pretoria
 National Library of Wales, Aberystwyth
 National Library, Singapore
 New Orleans Public Library
 New York Public Library, New York, New York
 Newberry Library, Chicago, Illinois
 Nottingham Subscription Library, Nottingham

O

 Openbare Bibliotheek Amsterdam, Netherlands
 O'Meara Mathematics Library, Notre Dame, Indiana
 Orange County Library System, Orlando, Florida
 Oregon State Library, Salem, Oregon
 Orlando East Public Library, Soweto, South Africa
 Ottawa Public Library, Ottawa, Ontario, Canada

P

 Pack Memorial Library, Asheville, North Carolina
 Palm Beach County Library System, West Palm Beach, Florida
 Park Ridge Public Library, Park Ridge, Illinois
 Parker Library, Corpus Christi College, Cambridge
 Peckham Library
 Peking University Library, Beijing, China
 Pepys Library, Magdalene College, Cambridge
 Perpustakaan Tun Sri Lanang, Universiti Kebangsaan Malaysia, Bangi
 Pikes Peak Library District, Colorado Springs, Colorado
 Plainfield Public Library District, Plainfield, Illinois
 Powell Library, University of California Los Angeles, Los Angeles, California
 Prince George's County Memorial Library System, Largo, Maryland
 Pritzker Military Library, Chicago, Illinois
 Public Library of Charlotte and Mecklenburg County
 Punjab Public Library, Lahore

Q

 Quaid-e-Azam Library, Lahore
 Queens Library, New York, New York

R

 Regenstein Library, University of Chicago, Chicago, Illinois
 Regina Public Library, Regina, Saskatchewan, Canada
 Rhodes University Library, Rhodes University, Grahamstown, South Africa
 Rock Island Public Library, Rock Island, Illinois
 Robarts Library, University of Toronto, Canada
 Royal Danish Library
 Royal Library of Sweden
 Ruskin Library at Lancaster University, UK
 Russian State Children's Library, Moscow
 Russian State Library, Moscow

S

 Sacramento Public Library, Sacramento, California
 St. Louis Public Library, St. Louis, Missouri
 Salt Lake City Public Library, Salt Lake City, Utah
 San Antonio Public Library, San Antonio, Texas
 San Diego County Library, San Diego, California
 San Diego Public Library, San Diego, California
 San Francisco Public Library, San Francisco, California
 San José Public Library, San Jose, California 
 Santa Clara County Library District
 Saxon State and University Library Dresden, Dresden, Germany
 Scarabelli library, Caltanissetta, Italy
 Schlesinger Library
 Scientific and Technical Library, National Technical University "Kharkiv Polytechnic Institute", Ukraine
 Seattle Central Library, Seattle Washington
 Shanghai Library, Shanghai, China
 Sichuan Library, Chengdu, China
 Smyrna Public Library, Smyrna, Georgia
 South San Francisco Public Library
 Southfield Public Library, Southfield, Michigan
 SS. Cyril and Methodius National Library, Sofia, Bulgaria
 State Central Library, Kerala, Thiruvananthapuram, India
 State Library of New South Wales, Sydney, Australia
 State Library of Queensland, Brisbane, Australia
 State Library of Victoria, Melbourne, Australia
 State Library of Württemberg, Stuttgart, Germany
 Stockholm Public Library, Stockholm, Sweden
 Stretford Library, Trafford
 Sun Yat-sen Library of Guangdong Province, Guangzhou, China

T

 Tata Institute of Social Sciences (TISS) SDTM Library, Mumbai, India
 Texas A&M University Libraries, College Station, Texas
 Thomas S. Power Library, Offutt AFB, Nebraska
 Topeka & Shawnee County Public Library, Topeka, Kansas
 Toronto Public Library, Toronto
 Toronto Reference Library, Toronto
 Troy Public Library, Troy, New York
 Twinsburg Public Library
 Tribhuvan University Central Library, Kathmandu, Nepal

U

 U. Grant Miller Library, Washington & Jefferson College
 University of Central Florida Libraries, Orlando, Florida
 University of Coimbra General Library, Coimbra, Portugal
 University of Florida Library System
 University of Applied Sciences Augsburg Library
 University of Houston Libraries
 University of Queensland Library, Brisbane, Australia
 University of South Florida Tampa Library, Tampa, Florida
 University of Sydney Library, Sydney, Australia
 University of Zambia Library

V

 Valley Library, Oregon State University, Corvallis, Oregon
 Vancouver Public Library, Vancouver
 Vancouver Tool Library and Community Access Center (VTLCAC), Tool Library, Vancouver, Washington
 Vatican Library in Vatican City
 Vilnius University Library

W

 W.E.B. Du Bois Library, University of Massachusetts Amherst
 Wiener Library for the Study of the Nazi Era and the Holocaust, Tel Aviv, Israel
 Wellcome Library, London
 West German Audio Book Library for the Blind, Münster, Germany
 William F. Ekstrom Library, University of Louisville, Louisville, Kentucky
 William T. Young Library, University of Kentucky
 Windhoek Public Library in Windhoek, Namibia
 Winnipeg Public Library, Winnipeg, Manitoba, Canada
 Wren Library, Trinity College, Cambridge

Y

 Yale University Library, Yale University
 YeungNam University Library, South Korea
 Yiu Tung Public Library, Shau Kei Wan, Hong Kong Island, Hong Kong
 Younes and Soraya Nazarian Library, Haifa, Israel

Z

Zillur Rahman Library, Aligarh, India

See also
Esperanto libraries
List of destroyed libraries
List of largest libraries
List of libraries in the ancient world
List of national libraries
List of libraries by country
List of archives
List of librarians

References

External links 
 American Library Association's list of largest US libraries, ala.org
 libraries.org: a directory of about 200,000 worldwide libraries maintained by Marshall Breeding, librarytechnology.org
 Libraries of the world and their catalogues, compiled by a retired librarian, sylviamilne.co.uk
 National libraries of Europe, theeuropeanlibrary.org
 LIBweb - directory of library servers in 146 countries via WWW
 UNESCO libraries portal - over 14000 links worldwide, unesco.org
 

Libraries